Querol is a municipality in the comarca of Alt Camp, Tarragona, Catalonia, Spain.

It is situated in the north-eastern section of the region. It has an altitude of 565 m. In the 2012 census the population was 559. With an area of 71.88 km2. This works out to a population density of 7.776850 people/km2. The municipal budget for 2008 was €1,566,000.

References

External links
 Government data pages 

  

Municipalities in Alt Camp